Christian Robert von Bülow af Radum (14 December 1917 – 13 January 2002) was a Danish sailor. He competed in the dragon class at the 1956 and 1964 Olympics and won a silver and a gold medal, respectively.

References

External links
 
 
 
 

1917 births
2002 deaths
Danish male sailors (sport)
Olympic sailors of Denmark
Olympic gold medalists for Denmark
Olympic medalists in sailing
Olympic silver medalists for Denmark
Sailors at the 1956 Summer Olympics – Dragon
Sailors at the 1964 Summer Olympics – Dragon
Medalists at the 1956 Summer Olympics
Medalists at the 1964 Summer Olympics
Royal Danish Yacht Club sailors
Sportspeople from Copenhagen